A Place of One's Own is a 1945 British film directed by Bernard Knowles. An atmospheric ghost story based on the 1940 novel of the same title by Osbert Sitwell, it stars James Mason, Barbara Mullen, Margaret Lockwood, Dennis Price and Dulcie Gray. Mason and Mullen are artificially aged to play the old couple. It was one of the cycle of Gainsborough Melodramas.

Plot 

The Smedhursts, newly retired, buy Bellingham House, which has been vacant for over 40 years and is rumoured to be haunted by the previous owner, Elizabeth, who is widely believed to have been murdered by her guardians. Mrs Smedhurst employs a young lady, Annette, as a companion. Annette becomes haunted by Elizabeth, who is waiting for her lover, Dr Marsham. Mr Smedhurst asks the police to find Dr Marsham, and he comes to visit Annette/Elizabeth. The next morning, everyone in the house feels "lighter" and Annette wakes up recovered. A local policeman arrives and announces that Dr Marsham has been found but will not be able to visit as he has died...

Cast

 Margaret Lockwood as Annette 
 James Mason as Mr. Smedhurst 
 Barbara Mullen as Mrs. Smedhurst 
 Dennis Price as Dr. Selbie 
 Helen Haye as Mrs. Manning-Tutthorn 
 Michael Shepley as Major Manning-Tutthorn 
 Dulcie Gray as Sarah 
 Moore Marriott as George 
 O. B. Clarence as Perkins 
 Helen Goss as Rosie, the Barmaid  
 Edie Martin as Cook  
 Gus McNaughton as Police Constable Hargreaves
 Muriel George as Nurse  
 John Turnbull as Sir Roland Jervis  
 Ernest Thesiger as Dr. Richard Marsham
 Henry B. Longhurst as Inspector 
 Aubrey Mallalieu as Canon Mowbray

Production
The film was based on a novel published in 1942.

James Mason wrote in his memoirs that when he read the script "not only did I enthuse but I even asked that I might be permitted to play the role of the elderly retiree in the story."

This was the first time Margaret Lockwood used a beauty spot on her cheek in a film, something which became a trademark.

Reception
According to Kinematograph Weekly the film performed well at the British box office in 1945.

Considering the popularity at the time of stars James Mason and Margaret Lockwood, however, the film was considered a financial disappointment. Mason later wrote in his memoirs that the blame needed to be shared between himself, for wanting to play the role, and the producer, for letting him.
Of course it could have turned out a failure even if the most suitable actor in the world had played that part. But the reactions of the top brass at the studio did nothing to allay my own feeling of guilt for having volunteered my services. In any case it was not that I was incapable of turning my hand to a character part, it was just that I had amassed what I always realized was an absurd degree of popularity, and the fan population wanted me to appear only as some heroic young lady-killer; or better-still, ladybasher.
He also blamed director Bernard Knowles:
Knowles deserved his share [of blame] because he had never got over Citizen Kane and still thought that it was a shortcut to success if one had the actors play immensely long sequences without any intercutting or covering shots. In Citizen Kane the director could afford to do this because Herman Mankiewicz had revised one strong situation after another.
The film was not released in the US until 1949.

References

External links
 
A Place of One's Own at Britmovie
 
 
Review of film at Variety
Review of film at The New York Times
Complete film at Internet Archive

1945 films
1945 drama films
British black-and-white films
Gainsborough Pictures films
1940s thriller films
British haunted house films
Films set in England
Films set in the 1900s
British historical films
1940s historical films
Films directed by Bernard Knowles
British drama films
Islington Studios films
Films based on British novels
1940s English-language films
1940s British films